Kerem Gönlüm (born November 22, 1977) is a Turkish former professional basketball player for Sigortam.net İTÜ Basket of the Turkish Basketball League. In 2019 January, he started punditry on a local radio station. Gonlum served a one-year ban stemming from a positive doping test during the 2009 Turkish League final series.

Professional career
Betyween 2005 and 2014, Gönlüm played for Anadolu Efes. 

Gonlum served a one-year ban stemming from a positive doping test during the 2009 Turkish League final series.

In June 2014, he signed a two-year deal with Galatasaray Liv Hospital. In July 2015, he left Galatasaray and signed with Pınar Karşıyaka.

In July 2016, Gönlüm signed with Sakarya BB of the Turkish Basketball First League. On November 16, 2017, he parted ways with Sakarya and signed with Bahcesehir.

On August 7, 2019, he signed with Sigortam.net İTÜ Basket of the Turkish Basketball League.  After playing only 3 games, his contract was terminated by his club.

National team
Gönlüm was a member of the Turkish national team.

References

External links
 Kerem Gönlüm at eurobasket.com
 Kerem Gönlüm at euroleague.net
 Kerem Gönlüm at tblstat.net

1977 births
Living people
2006 FIBA World Championship players
2010 FIBA World Championship players
2014 FIBA Basketball World Cup players
Anadolu Efes S.K. players
Centers (basketball)
Doping cases in basketball
Galatasaray S.K. (men's basketball) players
İstanbul Teknik Üniversitesi B.K. players
Karşıyaka basketball players
People from İskenderun
Power forwards (basketball)
TED Ankara Kolejliler players
Turkish men's basketball players
Turkish sportspeople in doping cases
Ülker G.S.K. basketball players
Sportspeople from Hatay